The 1920 Copa de Honor Cousenier was the 15° (and last) edition of this competition. It was contested by the champions of Copa de Honor Municipalidad de Buenos Aires (Argentina) and Copa de Honor (Uruguay).

After the Argentine representative Banfield (winner of Copa de Honor) disaffiliated from the AFA, Boca Juniors contested the competition as runner-up. The team beat Universal FC) at Estadio Gran Parque Central, the main stadium of Uruguay during the first decades of the 20th. century. Due to schedule problems this final was played three years later, being held on September 20, 1923 in Montevideo as usual.

It was the first competition won by Boca Juniors outside Argentina.

Match details 

|

|}

References

c
1920 in Uruguayan football
1920 in Argentine football